Student Venture is an interdenominational Christian organization affiliated with Campus Crusade for Christ that promotes evangelism and discipleship on junior and senior high school campuses.

Activities
Student Venture activities include student meetings, discussion groups, 1-on-1 counseling, leadership training, conferences, retreats and summer mission trip opportunities.

In 1994, the New York Times reported that Student Venture had helped organize junior high and high school students into prayer groups with over 177,000 participants.

Court rulings
In the 1980s, Student Venture was denied permission to rent meeting space from a Centinnel, Pa., high school. A lawsuit was subsequently filed by Student Venture's parent organization, Campus Crusade for Christ, which eventually went to the Supreme Court. The Court ruled in 1990 that religious groups are entitled to rent space in public schools.

References

External links

Christian youth organizations
Evangelical parachurch organizations
Christian organizations established in 1966
Youth organizations based in the United States